No. 664 Squadron AAC is a squadron of the British Army's Army Air Corps.

History

664 Aviation Squadron AAC was formed from the air troops of the parachute battalions of 16 Parachute Brigade and based at Jersey Brow hangar at the Royal Aircraft Establishment, Farnborough. In 1971 it was renamed  664 Parachute Squadron AAC. When the brigade was disbanded the Squadron reverted to being known as Squadron AAC.

 Minden | 1981-1983
 Minden | 1983-1990
 Detmold | 1990-1994

664 Squadron was converted to fly and fight Apache Attack Helicopters in 2007, following which it spent many of the next 7 years conducting operational tours to Helmand Province in Afghanistan where it was initially part of the Joint Helicopter Force (UK JHF(A)), and then from 2010 part of the UK's Joint Aviation Group based at Camp Bastion under command of the USMC Expeditionary Force, flying in direct support of conventional forces on the ground such as Task Force Helmand and the Afghan Security Forces as well as Special Forces from a number of Coalition nations.

See also

 List of Army Air Corps aircraft units

References

Citations

Bibliography

External links
 

Army Air Corps aircraft squadrons
Military units and formations established in 1969